The Liaoning Broadcast and Television Tower is a tall free-standing structure used for communication. Within the "disk" of the tower, accessible through an elevator, there is an indoor observation deck, a rotating restaurant, and a small bar. On the top of the disk is an outdoor observation deck. This tower is in the World Federation of Great Towers.

See also 
 Liaoning Television
 List of towers

References

External links 
 Review of Shengyang TV Tower by TravelBookChina.com
 "Liaoning Broadcasting and TV Tower." China National Tourism Administration
 
 Liaoning Broadcast and Television Tower at Sinotrip.com

Towers completed in 1989
Observation towers in China
Buildings and structures in Shenyang
Communication towers in China
Towers with revolving restaurants
1989 establishments in China